Goert Giltay (born 3 March 1952)  is a Dutch cinematographer.

Giltay graduated from the ArtEZ Academy of Visual Arts (1970-1971) и Netherlands Film Academy (1972-1976).

Selected filmography
 The Pointsman (1986)
 The Flying Dutchman (1995)
 No Trains No Planes (1999)
 Bluebird (2004) 
 Duska (2007)
 The Girl and Death (2012)
 Becoming Zlatan (2015)
 A Real Vermeer (2016)

References

External links
 Official website
 

1952 births
People from Zandvoort
Living people
Dutch cinematographers
Golden Calf winners